Gerd Bonk (26 August 1951 – 20 October 2014) was a weightlifter active for East Germany from 1969 to 1980 who during his career won a silver medal at the 1976 Summer Olympics, a bronze medal at the 1972 Summer Olympics, set two world records and achieved numerous other top-three ranks at World Championships and European Weightlifting Championships. He was also a master mechanic.

Biography
Bonk began his career at BSG Motor Nema Netzschkau as a track and field athlete and set the East German youth record for the shot put in 1967 with 17.82 m. To build up the necessary strength for shot putting, he regularly lifted weights. After participating in weightlifting contests and having greater successes in it than in shot putting, he shifted his focus completely towards weightlifting in 1969 at SC Karl-Marx-Stadt, Chemnitz. His coach was Klaus Kroll, a former top weightlifter of the GDR. In 1971 Bonk became GDR super heavyweight champion (with a bodyweight above 110 kg). During the Baltic-Cup, in Lübeck in the same year, he had his international debut, where he made three failed pressing attempts. Being a top lifter, he was never able to beat Vasiliy Alekseyev from the Soviet Union or Rudolf Mang from Germany up to 1980. His specialty was the clean and jerk, where he set two world records. In 1980 he once more placed  third at the European Championships and even lifted 430 kg (180–250) in a smaller competition. Because he was not nominated for the 1980 Olympic Games in Moscow, he stepped back from professional weightlifting.

Bonk lived in Limbach/Vogtland as a pensioner. He was one of the prominent victims of doping in East Germany  reporting in 2003 that he had "diabetes, a failing liver and his feet are numb, among a host of signs of a failing body".

In 2002 he was awarded the Georg von Opel Prize for Silent Winners in the category "Special Warriors".

World records
Bonk set two world records in clean and jerk:
 246.5 kg, 1975 in Karl-Marx-Stadt (Chemnitz)
 252.5 kg, 1976 in Berlin.

GDR Championships

Bonk was East German champion in 1971, 1973, 1974, 1975, 1976, 1977 and 1979 and won another 15 East German champion titles in clean and press (until 1972), snatch and clean and jerk.

References

1951 births
2014 deaths
People from Vogtlandkreis
German male weightlifters
Sportspeople from Saxony
Olympic medalists in weightlifting
Medalists at the 1976 Summer Olympics
Medalists at the 1972 Summer Olympics
Olympic silver medalists for East Germany
Olympic bronze medalists for East Germany
Weightlifters at the 1972 Summer Olympics
Weightlifters at the 1976 Summer Olympics
European Weightlifting Championships medalists
World Weightlifting Championships medalists